Raphaël Lessard (pronounced "less-ard"; born July 5, 2001) is a Canadian professional stock car racing driver. He currently competes part-time in the NASCAR Pinty's Series for Ed Hakonson Racing. He last competed part-time in the NASCAR Camping World Truck Series driving the No. 24 Chevrolet Silverado for GMS Racing.  
He has also driven for Venturini Motorsports in the ARCA Racing Series, and GMS Racing, Kyle Busch Motorsports and DGR-Crosley in the Truck Series.

Racing career

Early career
Lessard started racing in an old Honda Civic, winning his first race on the day of his twelfth birthday. He then ran Quebec sportsmans and super late models in Canada before moving to America.

CARS Tour

2015
His first American racing experience came in the CARS Super Late Model Tour, driving the 2015 season for Toyota Racing Development and David Gilliland Racing.

2016
In 2016, at age 15, and in grade 10, he became the second non-American to win the CARS Super Late Model series championship, the other being Mario Gosselin, also a Canadian from Quebec, who accomplished the feat in 1997. It was Lessard's first championship. He won four of ten races during the season, including the season finale at Southern National Motorsports Park. Lessard continued with Toyota and David Gilliland Racing to run late model racing in large events like the Winchester 400, Snowball Derby and various PASS Late Model, CRA Racing Series and ARCA Racing Series events.

2017
To start off 2017 he was disqualified from an April PASS race for intentionally wrecking other drivers, illegally passing under yellow, and inappropriate actions by his crew.

ARCA Racing Series

2017
He debuted in the ARCA Racing Series in 2017 driving for Venturini Motorsports. He made the top ten in his second start at Winchester Speedway.

NASCAR

Truck Series

2019
On February 15, 2019, it was announced that Lessard will drive three races in the No. 46 Toyota Tundra for Kyle Busch Motorsports in the NASCAR Gander Outdoors Truck Series. Lessard started 7th and finished 14th in his Truck Series debut at Martinsville. In June, he joined DGR-Crosley's No. 17 truck for the Iowa Speedway and Canadian Tire Motorsport Park races.

2020
In 2020, Lessard joined KBM for the full Truck season in the No. 4 Tundra. Despite missing the playoffs, he won his first career Truck race at Talladega Superspeedway when he was leading as the caution came out on the final lap, becoming the first French Canadian to win in a NASCAR national series.

2021
Lessard lost his KBM ride to John Hunter Nemechek in 2021 and subsequently moved to GMS Racing to drive the No. 24. The plans initially outlined a 12-race schedule before it was increased to the full season. However, funding troubles forced him out of the truck after seven races.

Xfinity Series

2022
Lessard was scheduled to drive the No. 87 for SQR Development on a part-time basis in the NASCAR Xfinity Series throughout the 2022 season but would later be released from the team before the season even started due to Lessard taking issue with a sexual harassment case involving team-owner J. C. Stout.

Pinty’s Series

2019

Lessard would make his Pinty’s Series debut at Autodrome Chaudière. He would go onto to win in his Series debut.

2021

Lessard would sweep the first two races at Sunset, making him a perfect 3 for 3 in his Pinty’s Series career.

Personal life
Lessard's father was a race car driver but sold his cars to help move Raphaël's racing career.

Motorsports career results

NASCAR
(key) (Bold – Pole position awarded by qualifying time. Italics – Pole position earned by points standings or practice time. * – Most laps led.)

Camping World Truck Series

K&N Pro Series East

Pinty's Series

ARCA Menards Series
(key) (Bold – Pole position awarded by qualifying time. Italics – Pole position earned by points standings or practice time. * – Most laps led.)

 Season still in progress
 Ineligible for series points

References

External links

Website

2001 births
People from Chaudière-Appalaches
Racing drivers from Quebec
NASCAR drivers
Living people
ARCA Menards Series drivers
Kyle Busch Motorsports drivers